Helton Sergio Jacinto Ubisse (born 31 January 1995) is a Mozambican basketball player for Ferroviário da Beira and the Mozambique national basketball team.

Club career
Ubisse has played in his native Mozambique with Ferroviário da Beira. In 2019, he shortly played on loan for  Ferroviário de Maputo in the 2021 BAL Qualifying Tournaments. He helped Maputo qualify for the inaugural season of the Basketball Africa League.

National team career
Ubisse has played with the Mozambique national team at AfroBasket tournament in 2015 and 2017. In the 2017 tournament, he averaged 10.7 points per game.

BAL career statistics

|-
| style="text-align:left;"|2022
| style="text-align:left;"|Ferroviário da Beira
| 5 || 4 || 21.4 || .400 || .000 || .792 || 4.4 || 1.0 || 0.2 || 0.2 || 2.4
|-
|- class="sortbottom"
| style="text-align:center;" colspan="2"|Career
| 5 || 4 || 21.4 || .400 || .000 || .792 || 4.4 || 1.0 || 0.2 || 0.2 || 2.4

References

External links

1995 births
Living people
Mozambican basketball players
Centers (basketball)
Clube Ferroviário da Beira basketball players
Ferroviário de Maputo (basketball) players
Sportspeople from Maputo